Siyâvash, Siyavush, or Siyavush Beg (c. 1536 — pre-1616) was an Iranian illustrator of Georgian origin known for his miniatures with dramatic landscape elements and well-organized compositions. He was active at the court of the Safavid shahs of Iran.

According to the Persian chronicler Qazi Ahmad, Siyâvash was a Georgian slave brought to Tabriz as a child and assigned to the royal studio where he studied under Muzaffar 'Ali, artist and close companion to the Safavid shah Tahmasp I. Among his students was Veli Can.

References

External link

1530s births
17th-century deaths
Persian miniature painters
Iranian people of Georgian descent
16th-century painters of Safavid Iran
17th-century painters of Safavid Iran